The Mount View Lunatic Asylum (alternates: Mt. View Lunatic Asylum, Mount View Asylum) was a psychiatric hospital located on  near the Basin Reserve in Wellington, New Zealand. Government House is now located on what were the asylum grounds. Work began in 1872, and the hospital opened in May 1873. It replaced Karori Lunatic Asylum, the first asylum in the country. Mount View was planned to accommodate 28 male and 28 female patients, but as 70 patients were transferred from Karori, overcrowding was a problem from the beginning.  An expansion was required soon after the asylum opened to accommodate more patients, so in 1879 the two-storey wooden structure was enlarged with a block for 50 male patients, and another wing was built during 1880. Around 1885 two additional wards were constructed. By 1905 there were 250 patients but within the next five years, they were transferred to Porirua Lunatic Asylum and other asylums, before Mount View's closure in 1910.

References

Hospital buildings completed in 1873
Buildings and structures in Wellington City
Psychiatric hospitals in New Zealand
Defunct hospitals in New Zealand
Hospitals established in 1873
1910 disestablishments in New Zealand
1870s architecture in New Zealand